Elevator:2010 was an inducement prize contest with the purpose of developing space elevator and space elevator-related technologies. Elevator:2010 organized annual competitions for climbers, ribbons and power-beaming systems, and was operated by a partnership between Spaceward Foundation and the NASA Centennial Challenges.

History 

On March 23, 2005 NASA's Centennial Challenges program announced a partnership with the Spaceward Foundation regarding Elevator:2010, to raise the amounts of monetary prizes and to get more teams involved in the competitions. The partnership was not renewed after its initial 5-year term.

There were two (out of an intended seven) competitions of the NASA Centennial Challenges which fell under the Elevator:2010 banner: The Tether Challenge and the Beam Power Challenge. There were also the two original competitions.

Tether Challenge 
This competition presented the challenge of constructing super-strong tethers, a crucial component of a space elevator. The 2005 contest was to award US$50,000 to the team which constructed the strongest tether, with contests in future years requiring that each winner outperform that of the previous year by 50%. No competing tether surpassed the commercial off-the-shelf baseline and the prize was increased to $200,000 in 2006.

Of the four teams competing, three were disqualified for not following length rules—one of these cases by a fraction of a millimeter. Ultimately, the 'House Tether' won against the remaining team. The 'House Tether' is composed of Zylon fiber and M77 adhesive.

Beam Power Challenge 
The Beam Power Challenge was a competition to build a wirelessly-powered ribbon-climbing robot. The contest involves having the robot raise a specified payload to a specific height within a limited period of time. However no team met the minimum standard in 2005.

In 2006 the prize for first place increased to $150,000 with the goal of climbing 50 meters in under 1 minute. It was held October 20–21, 2006 at the Las Cruces International Airport at the Wirefly X PRIZE Cup. 13 teams entered the competition.

The Challenge had $500,000 in prize money for the 2007 competition.

At the 2009 Challenge, on November 6, 2009, LaserMotive successfully used lasers to drive a  device up a  cable suspended from a helicopter. Energy is transmitted to the climber using a high-power infrared beam. This marked both a performance record, and the first award of a cash prize at the Challenge.

LaserMotive won the  prize for the Level 1 power beaming prize in 2009 with the achievement of  climber speed over a sub-kilometer climb.  The Level 2 power beaming prize, for a  climb, remains available for future competitions.

Future competitions 

The Japan Space Elevator Association conducted climbing competitions in August 2013.

See also

 KC Space Pirates
 Launch loop
 Lightcraft
 Lunar space elevator
 Non-rocket spacelaunch
 Skyhook (structure)
 Space elevator construction
 Space elevator economics
 Space elevators in fiction
 Space elevator safety
 Space fountain
 Space gun
 Tether propulsion

References

External links
 
 The Spaceward Foundation 

Space elevator
Challenge awards
Awards established in 2005